The 2010 United States Mixed Doubles Curling Championship was held from December 3–6, 2009 at the Granite Curling Club in Seattle, Washington. Sharon Vukich and Mike Calcagno won the tournament, earning the right to represent the United States at the 2010 World Mixed Doubles Curling Championship in Chelyabinsk, Russia.

Teams 
Nineteen teams qualified to compete in the championship.

Round robin 

The 19 teams were split into three pools; each pool played a round robin and at the end the top two teams advanced to the playoffs. The standings at the end of the round robin phase were:

Playoffs 
The playoffs consisted of a 6-team bracket with the top two teams receiving byes in the quarterfinals.

Bracket

Quarterfinals 
Saturday, December 5, 8:00pm PT

Semifinals 
Sunday, December 6, 9:00am PT

Final 
Sunday, December 6, 12:00pm ET

References 

United States National Curling Championships
United States Mixed Doubles Championship
United States Mixed Doubles Championship
United States Mixed Doubles Curling Championship
Sports competitions in Seattle
United States Mixed Doubles Curling Championship
Curling in Washington (state)
United States